Aristides Bastidas is one of the 14 municipalities of the state of Yaracuy, Venezuela. The municipality is located in northern Yaracuy, occupying an area of 74 km ² with a population of 16,839 inhabitants in 2001. The capital lies at San Pablo. The municipality was established in 1993 in memory of writer Aristides Bastidas, the famous son of the main town in the municipality, San Pablo.

References

External links
Official site

Municipalities of Yaracuy